These are the official results of the Women's High Jump event at the 1997 IAAF World Championships in Athens, Greece. There were a total number of 26 participating athletes, with two qualifying groups on Friday August 8, and the final round held on Sunday August 10, 1997.

Medalists

Results

Qualifying round
Qualification: Qualifying Performance 1.94 (Q) or at least 12 best performers (q) advance to the final.

Final

See also
 National champions high jump (women)
 1995 Women's World Championships High Jump
 1996 Women's Olympic High Jump
 1999 Women's World Championships High Jump

References
 Results

H
High jump at the World Athletics Championships
1997 in women's athletics